Sven Otto Svensson was a Swedish chess master.

He won in the 1st Nordic Chess Championship at Stockholm 1897, took 3rd at Stockholm 1905 (the 5th Nordic-ch), took 11th at Stockholm 1906 (Ossip Bernstein and Carl Schlechter won), and took 5th at Copenhagen 1916 (Paul Johner won).

References

Swedish chess players
Year of death missing
Year of birth missing